Ruth E. Rowe (born March 11, 1947, in Pittsburgh) is an American former archer and has also coached the sport.

Archery

Rowe took up archery at the University of Pittsburgh where she earned a degree in biology.

Rowe won a bronze medal at the 1975 World Archery Championships, a gold medal at the 1977 World Archery Championships
and another bronze at the 1983 World Archery Championships. All were in the women's team event.

At the 1983 Pan American Games she won gold medals in the women's individual recurve and women's recurve team events. In the 1995 edition she won another women's recurve team gold.

Rowe finished twelfth at the 1984 Summer Olympic Games in the women's individual event with 2477 points.

She later became coach of the US Virgin Islands archery team.

References

External links 
 Profile on worldarchery.org

1947 births
Living people
American female archers
Olympic archers of the United States
Archers at the 1984 Summer Olympics
World Archery Championships medalists
Pan American Games medalists in archery
Pan American Games gold medalists for the United States
Archers at the 1983 Pan American Games
Archers at the 1995 Pan American Games
People from Pittsburgh
University of Pittsburgh alumni
Medalists at the 1983 Pan American Games
Medalists at the 1995 Pan American Games
21st-century American women